James H. Weaver served as the ninth Secretary of State of Alabama from 1856 to 1860.

In addition to serving as Secretary of State, he served for a term as Sheriff of Coosa County, AL and was elected to the Alabama House of Representatives in 1853.

References

Year of birth missing
Year of death missing
Secretaries of State of Alabama
People from Coosa County, Alabama
Alabama sheriffs
Members of the Alabama House of Representatives